Lost Horizon is a power metal band from Gothenburg, Sweden. The band has esoteric stage personas similar to sword and sorcery fantasy, with the members wearing studded leather, cloaks and face paint. In their albums' liner notes, their stage names and roles are exaggerated to sound mystical and otherworldly in nature; for example, guitarist and lyricist Wojtek Lisicki is credited as the "Earthshape" of the "Transcendental Protagonist" and credited for "Poesy of Spiritual Enlightenment/String Romanticism", with his proper roles given as a "Translation For Mortals".

History 
Lost Horizon was originally formed under the name Highlander in 1990, with future HammerFall member Joacim Cans on vocals. The band went on hiatus from 1994 to 1999. Shortly after their reformation, the band changed its name to Lost Horizon, and Cans left to be replaced by Daniel Heiman. With the new lineup, Lost Horizon released their first studio album Awakening the World in 2001.

In 2002, the band gained two new members: second guitarist Fredrik Olsson and keyboardist Attila Publik. The new lineup released A Flame to the Ground Beneath in 2003. Heiman and Olsson left Lost Horizon two years later, putting the band on hiatus. Their official website released three instrumental demos ("Wizard", "Spirit" and "Fire") in 2009, but no new musical activities have been announced since then.

Band members 
 Transcendental Protagonist (Wojtek Lisicki) - guitars (Luciferion, Against The Plagues)
 Cosmic Antagonist (Martin Furängen) - bass (Luciferion)
 Preternatural Transmogrifyer (Christian Nyquist) - drums
 Perspicacious Protector (Attila Publik) - keyboards

Official former  members 
 Ethereal Magnanimus (Daniel Heiman) - vocals (ex-Fierce Conviction, ex-Crystal Eyes, ex-Destiny (Swe), Heed)
 Equilibrian Epicurius (Fredrik Olsson) - guitars (ex-Destiny (Swe), Heed)

Timeline

Discography 
Studio albums
 2001: Awakening the World 
 2003: A Flame to the Ground Beneath

See also 

 Heed, formed in 2004 by ex-Lost Horizon members Daniel Heiman (vocals) and Fredrik Olsson (guitar)

External links 
 Lost Horizon Official Website

Swedish power metal musical groups
Musical groups established in 1990
Swedish progressive metal musical groups